Aquin is an arrondissement in the Sud Department of Haiti. As of 2015, the population was 217,827 inhabitants. Postal codes in the Aquin Arrondissement start with the number 83.

It contains the following communes:
 Aquin
 Cavaillon
 Saint-Louis du Sud

References

Arrondissements of Haiti
Sud (department)